SGR J1745−2900, or PSR J1745−2900, is the first-discovered magnetar orbiting the black hole Sagittarius A*, in the center of the Milky Way. The magnetar was discovered in 2013 using the Effelsberg 100-m Radio Telescope, the Nancay Decimetric Radio Telescope, and the Jodrell Bank Lovell Telescope. The magnetar has a period of 3.76 s and a magnetic flux density of ∼ 1010 T (1014 G). The magnetar is 0.33 ly from the central black hole.

The object offers an unparalleled tool for probing the ionized interstellar medium (ISM) toward the Galactic Center (GC), and a possible way to test quantum gravity effects.

References

Soft gamma repeaters
Sagittarius (constellation)
?
Magnetars